The Forum (formerly Forum 28) is a theatre, media and arts centre located in Barrow-in-Furness, Cumbria, England. The complex is currently home to a large theatre and stage, several conference and function rooms, Barrow's main tourist information centre and a Costa Coffee outlet. The Forum is situated in Central Barrow, opposite the town hall and perhaps is most famous for being the source of one of the world's worst Legionaires outbreaks in 2002.

The Forum is one of the area's main cultural and art centres and has hosted many musical artists, comedians and other performers, as well as hosting such events as the local multicultural festival and various career conventions. Many local and international theatre groups have used the Forum for their productions, plays and pantomimes.

See also
 List of theatres in the United Kingdom

Arts centres in England
Theatres in Cumbria
Tourist attractions in Barrow-in-Furness
Buildings and structures in Barrow-in-Furness